Peter Woodley Mann  (25 July 1924 in Perth, Western Australia – 24 August 1999 in Dunedin) was the sixth Anglican Bishop of the Diocese of Dunedin in Dunedin, New Zealand.

Mann was educated at Prince Alfred College, Adelaide and St John's College, Auckland before being ordained in 1954. He held curacies at Waiapu and Rotorua before holding incumbencies at Porangahau and Dannevirke. Later he was Archdeacon of Blenheim, Marlborough and Timaru before his ordination to the episcopate). He was consecrated a bishop on St Matthias' Day (24 February) 1976.

In the 1994 Queen's Birthday Honours, Mann was appointed a Commander of the Order of the British Empire, for services to the Anglican Church.

References

1924 births
1999 deaths
People educated at Prince Alfred College
Anglican archdeacons in New Zealand
20th-century Anglican bishops in New Zealand
Anglican bishops of Dunedin
New Zealand Commanders of the Order of the British Empire